365Mag is an e-zine about electronic music and the related subcultures / lifestyles. The e-zine is based in Amsterdam, the Netherlands.

History
365Mag was started in 2004. Alongside news, interviews, artist profiles and CD and party reviews, the magazine has added news on production equipment and technology, and more global developments within the international music scene. With the website offline as of March 2015, and the official Twitter account inactive since January 2015, it appears that 365mag has ceased to exist.

Focus
365Mag tends to focus on Progressive electronic music, with artists such as Sasha, John Digweed, Nick Warren and Steve Lawler among others. Particularly favoured styles include: minimal (e.g.: Luciano or Ricardo Villalobos), Neotrance (Tiefschwarz, James Holden, Daso or M.A.N.D.Y) or progressive (Hernan Cattaneo or Habersham).

Other activities
Alongside the E-zine, 365Mag is active during international dance events, for example the Winter Music Conference in Miami or Popkomm in Berlin. In its home city the magazine hosts events in clubs such as Panama and Paradiso and is involved in festivals such as Rockit open air, Free your mind and the Amsterdam dance event (where it usually takes care of some of the workshops). 365Mag is also involved in 365Live! (a live act) and a forthcoming new record label 365recordings. Furthermore 365Mag is actively involved with Ableton Life music software. If furthermore contains an extensive album and singles review section.

365mag Staff and Contributors

Staff:    	   	  
Ajos1 (USA, 	 	 	
Auke Ferwerda (NL), 	 	  	
Paul Sparkes (NL), 	  	  	
Rob Szepesi  (Founding Fool)(NL), 	  	  	
Youri Jozee (NL), 	

Interns: 
Erik Buis (NL),
Youri Jozee (NL)

Chief_Editors: 
Auke Ferwerda (NL)

Global_Editors: 
Alix Chodkowski (CA),
Belinda Healy (CHI),
Carlos Valdes (NL),
Celwin Frenzen (NL),
Daan Aalders (NL),
Damon G (USA),
Domenico Marte (UK),
Eric Deepdisco (USA),
Erwin Bullee (NL),
Evan Alexander (USA),
Florian Wizorek (DE),
Geoff Roberts (USA),
Harm Rhebergen (NL),
Harry Avers (USA),
James Wester (UK),
Jonas Lonna (Swe),
Kai (Kai and Chris) USA,
Katja Linders (NL),
Lisa Loco (UK),
Manu Ekanayake (UK),
Marnix Snaphaas (NL),
Martijn Szepesi (NL),
Michael Schmitt (USA),
Owen Johnson (USA),
Patrick Russell (USA),
Phil Martinez (USA),
Pim Verhaagen (NL),
Priscilla Berkouwer (NL),
Ruben Lansink (NL),
Steve Foulds (UK),
Steve Graham (USA),
Tess Kanters (NL),
Thijsjan Meindertsma (NL),
Xav Mohes Singh (NL),
Yuri Wuensch (CAN),

NL_Co_Ordinator:    	   	  	
Auke Ferwerda (NL)
 	 		
UK_Co_Ordinator:  
Manu Ekanayake (UK)

DE_Co_Ordinator:  
Florian Wizorek (DE) 

US_Co_Ordinator:   
Phil Martinez (USA)

References

External links
 
 Ableton Live

Dance music magazines
Defunct magazines published in the Netherlands
Magazines established in 2004
Magazines disestablished in 2015
Magazines published in Amsterdam
Music magazines published in the Netherlands
Online music magazines published in the Netherlands